Solon Peppas (born 25 October 1974) is a former professional tennis player from Greece.

Biography
Peppas, a right-handed player from Rhodes, featured in 23 Davis Cup ties for the Greece national team. In his Davis Cup career he won 18 singles matches, with a 20/14 overall record. He debuted on the ATP Tour at the 1994 Athens International, as a local wildcard entrant. His next main draw appearance was at the U.S. Pro Tennis Championships in 1999, where he had a win over Alberto Martin to make the round of 16. Following a runner-up finish at the 2000 Kiev Challenger he reached his highest career ranking of 149 in the world. He appeared as a qualifier in the main draw of the 2001 Gelsor Open Romania.

References

External links
 
 
 

1974 births
Living people
Greek male tennis players
People from Rhodes
Sportspeople from the South Aegean